CycleStreets is a not-for-profit United Kingdom organisation that provides a free-to-use national cycle journey planner for the United Kingdom. The planner uses OpenStreetMap data for routing, Shuttle Radar Topography Mission for height data and official postcode data. It was launched in March 2009 and by January 2010 had planned 100,000 journeys. As of August 2015, the site has planned over 45 million itineraries. It was 'Highly Commended' at the 2009 ACT Travelwise awards. It provides worldwide routing using OpenStreetMap data.

History
CycleStreets is a development of the Cambridge Cycle Campaign Journey Planner, which was launched in 2006. CycleStreets itself was launched on 20 March 2009; which was by co-incidence the same day that it was announced that the Transport Direct Portal was about to introduce cycle routing for a small number of trial locations including Manchester. In June 2009, a feature to plan circular routes was added and the project was featured in The Guardian newspaper. In August 2009 functionality was added to export routes for use in GPS device and the ability to route via ferry services and then in October 2009 the project released elevation profiles and 'Balanced routes'.

In December 2009, CycleStreets was 'Highly Commended' in the ACT Travelwise annual awards.

In February 2010, the ability to share short video clips was added and then in March 2010 CycleStreets added Google Streetview images to the route description pages and a post code look-up function. They reported their 100,000th journey plan itinerary the same month.

Development
In 2007, during the development of CycleStreets, Simon Nuttall and Martin Lucas-Smith advised Transport Direct on the CycleNetXChange data exchange standard for cycle route data which was later used in the Transport Direct Portal cycle journey planner.

In July 2009, CycleStreets was presented at the OpenStreetMap annual 'State of the Map' Conference In September 2009, Martin Lucas Smith of CycleStreets presented the project at the School of Cartography Summer School.

The project held its first 'Developer Day' in March 2010, where technical issues relating to the project were discussed and there was a session on cycle routing at WhereCampEU.

Funding
CycleStreets is a not-for-profit project and has been largely self-funded. It has received grants from the following organisations (in chronological order):

Cycling Scotland (£5,000): To develop a version of the site for Edinburgh, which Cycling Scotland are now promoting as a Scotland-wide system
Cambridge City Council — Cambridge Sustainable City project (£3,200) in February 2010.
Co-op Community Fund (£1,000) in March 2010.

The project has also benefited from a number of donations in kind, including geographic information donated in OpenStreetMap.

References

External links
CycleStreets website

Cycling in the United Kingdom
Organizations established in 2009
Non-profit organisations based in the United Kingdom
Route planning software
OpenStreetMap
Free and open-source Android software